Ludmila Armata (born 1954) is a Polish-born painter who lives and works in Quebec. She was born in Krakow and emigrated to Canada in 1981.

Her work is included in the collections of the Musée national des beaux-arts du Québec, and  the National Gallery of Art, Washington.

References

1954 births
20th-century Canadian women artists
21st-century Canadian women artists
Living people